Handzlik is a surname. Notable people with the surname include:

Dagmara Handzlik (born 1986), Cypriot long distance runner
Małgorzata Handzlik (born 1965), Polish politician
Mariusz Handzlik (1965–2010), Polish diplomat